David E. Parro (born April 30, 1957) is a Canadian former professional ice hockey goaltender.

Born in Saskatoon, Saskatchewan, Parro was drafted at 34th overall by the Boston Bruins. Parro was the first goalie selected in the 1977 NHL Entry Draft. Before getting the chance to play for Boston, Parro was claimed by the Quebec Nordiques in the 1979 NHL Expansion Draft. Two days later, the Nordiques traded him to the Washington Capitals. After remaining in the Capitals' organization until 1984, Parro spent several seasons in the International Hockey League before retiring.

Oddly, while Parro was the first goalie taken in the 1977 NHL Entry Draft, he was also the final player overall to be drafted by the World Hockey Association, as the Houston Aeros chose him with the final pick, 90th overall, in the 10th round of the 1977 WHA Amateur Draft.

Awards
 WCHL Second All-Star Team – 1976 & 1977

References

External links

Profile at hockeydraftcentral.com

1957 births
Living people
Boston Bruins draft picks
Canadian expatriate ice hockey players in the United States
Canadian ice hockey goaltenders
Hershey Bears players
Houston Aeros draft picks
Ice hockey people from Saskatchewan
Rochester Americans players
Salt Lake Golden Eagles (IHL) players
Sportspeople from Saskatoon
Washington Capitals players